The Trussell Trust is an NGO and charity that works to end the need for food banks in the United Kingdom. It "is based on, shaped, and guided by Christian principles" and supports a network of over 1,200 food bank centres to provide emergency food and compassionate, practical support to people in crisis, while campaigning for long-term change to the structural issues that lock people into poverty. Its main office is in Salisbury, England.

History 
The Trussell Trust was founded in 1997 by Paddy and Carol Henderson using a legacy left by Carol's mother, Betty Trussell. Initially, the charity worked in Bulgaria to improve conditions for children sleeping at Sofia Central Railway Station. In 2000, they began to work in the UK too, opening the first food bank in their hometown of Salisbury after they were contacted by a British mother who was struggling to feed her children.

Work

Food banks 

Today, the Trussell Trust support over 1,200 food bank centres across the UK, providing emergency food and support to people locked in poverty. Food bank centres in the Trussell Trust network account for roughly two-thirds of all emergency food bank provision in the UK.

In 2018–19, food banks in the Trussell Trust’s network distributed 1.6 million food bank parcels to people in crisis – a 19% increase on the previous year. Over half a million of these parcels went to children. In the last five years, food bank use in the Trussell Trust network has increased by 73%.

The top three reasons for people needing to use a food bank in the Trussell Trust network last year were 'income not covering essential costs', 'benefit delays', and 'benefit changes'.

The services provided by food banks may vary from area to area as they react to the needs of their community to provide help and support to local people in crisis. Generally non-perishable food is donated by the public at a range of places, such as schools, faith groups and businesses, as well as supermarket collection points. It is then sorted into emergency food parcels by more than 28,000 volunteers. People are referred to the food banks by professionals such as doctors, social services, Citizens Advice, police, and receive a food bank voucher. This means that they can receive a food bank parcel of three days’ nutritionally balanced, non-perishable food from their local food bank. Food banks also provide compassionate, dignified support and work hard to signpost people to agencies that can support with long-term issues to prevent people from needing to use the food bank again.

The Trussell Trust runs two out of three UK food banks and gave out 823,145 food parcels from April to September 2019, of which 301,653 went to children. This was 23% more than during the same period in 2018.  Insufficient benefit income caused 36%, delays in benefit payments caused 18% and changes to benefit caused 16%.  Welfare changes like Universal Credit and the Bedroom tax caused increased food bank use.  The Trussell Trust urged politicians from all parties to protect people from hunger. The Trust advocates ending the five-week wait for universal credit payments, ensuring benefit payments cover the basic costs of living, and emergency support for people in crisis.  Emma Revie of the Trussell Trust said, “What’s really concerning us is the steepness of the increase – 23% compared with the same period last year is such a step up. We’re really worried about what the coming winter is going to look like.  “Our benefits system is supposed to protect us all from being swept into poverty, but currently thousands of women, men and children are not receiving sufficient protection from destitution.”

Research and campaigning 
The Trussell Trust also carries out extensive research into food bank use in the UK, using this to campaign for change so that no one needs a food bank in the future. Working with the food banks in their network to gather evidence, the Trussell Trust regularly releases data on food bank use and is currently working on a three-year research project called State of Hunger. When complete, this will be the most extensive piece of research ever carried out on food bank use and hunger in the UK. The first year report was released in November 2019.

The Trussell Trust supports a number of charity coalitions including End Hunger UK, All Kids Count, Lift the Ban, and Stop the #DebtThreats. Their own campaign, #5WeeksTooLong, calls for an end to the current five-week wait for a first Universal Credit payment when people apply for the benefit. The campaign is backed by a range of organisations including The Children’s Society, Child Poverty Action Group, Church Action on Poverty, Crisis, the Disability Benefits Consortium, Gingerbread, and Homeless Link.

See also

 List of food banks

References

External links 

Food banks
Food politics
Charities based in Wiltshire
Poverty in the United Kingdom
British food and drink organisations